The Rubicon speech was delivered by South African President P. W. Botha on the evening of 15 August 1985 in Durban. The world was expecting Botha to announce major reforms in his government, including abolishing the apartheid system and the release of Nelson Mandela. However, the speech Botha actually delivered at the time did none of this.

The speech is known as the 'Rubicon speech' because in its second-last paragraph Botha used the phrase, "I believe that we are today crossing the Rubicon. There can be no turning back." alluding to the historical reference of Julius Caesar crossing the Rubicon River.

Background
After a long period of isolation and strained diplomatic relations between South Africa and the international community, the National Party decided to hold a meeting to bring about reforms in the government. However, the meeting was shrouded in secrecy and mystery, and Botha was reported to have kept quiet and to have not participated even though he was present. This was taken as a sign that he was approving of the proposed changes. There were also reports that Botha did not participate due to his doctor's orders to avoid emotional outburst and not to engage in discussions that might upset him. At the final draft of the original agreed speech, which would be named the "Prog speech" ("Prog" being short for the Progressive Federal Party, then in opposition), and which would have recognized black human dignity, eradicated all forms of discrimination, and created equal opportunities, the nature of the speech, in conjunction with the news that a US bank was threatening to call in its loan, made Botha feel that he was being forced to capitulate to the revolutionary movements. Botha, whose fierce will had earned him the name "Die Groot Krokodil" (The Great Crocodile), simply refused and said he was not going to make that speech but was going to draft his own.

The speech
Due to its anticipation and publicity by different international media houses, the speech was delivered live to a worldwide audience of over 200 million. Botha clearly stated that he was not willing to change his position regarding the apartheid system and that Nelson Mandela would not be released from prison. In referring to the decisions the speech references as "crossing the Rubicon", Botha accepted that South Africa was passing a point of no return and that his government would maintain the apartheid system regardless of the internal or international consequences.

Aftermath
The speech had serious ripple effects to the economy of South Africa and it also caused South Africa to be even more isolated by the international community. The rand fell drastically against major currencies and the economy continued to shrink rapidly in growth until after the democratic handover of power a decade later. The speech played an important role in creating the conditions for the government defaulting on part of South Africa national debt obligations in 1985. This is the first and so far only time South Africa experienced a sovereign default.

See also

Speech at the Opening of the Parliament of South Africa, 1990

References

1985 speeches
1985 in South Africa
Apartheid government
Events associated with apartheid